The first ever U.S. National Collegiate Gaelic Athletic Association (NCGAA) hurling championship took place in 2011.  Indiana University won the first championship, beating UC Berkeley 3-4 (13) to 1-6 (9). The University of Montana became the first team to win the championship back-to-back in 2014 and 2015.

The NCGAA Championship is held annually on Memorial Weekend.  Winners of the U.S. NCGAA hurling championship include:

In 2014, a second lower division of the championship known as the Shield was introduced.  The University of Pittsburgh won the Shield in 2014, 2015 and 2016.

References

Hurling competitions in the United States